The 2020 Oracle Challenger Series – Newport Beach was a professional tennis tournament played on outdoor hard courts. It was the third edition of the tournament, which was part of the 2020 ATP Challenger Tour and the 2020 WTA 125K series. It took place from January 27 – February 2, 2020 at the Newport Beach Tennis Club in Newport Beach, California, United States.

Point distribution

Men's singles main-draw entrants

Seeds

 1 Rankings are as of 20 January 2020.

Other entrants
The following players received wildcards into the singles main draw:
  Ulises Blanch
  Taylor Fritz
  Govind Nanda
  Michael Redlicki
  Frances Tiafoe

The following player received entry into the singles main draw using a protected ranking:
  Raymond Sarmiento

The following players received entry from the qualifying draw:
  Alexander Sarkissian
  Agustín Velotti

Women's singles main-draw entrants

Seeds

 1 Rankings are as of 20 January 2020.

Other entrants
The following players received wildcards into the singles main draw:
  Kayla Day
  Allie Kiick
  Katie Volynets
  Sophia Whittle

The following player received entry using a protected ranking into the singles main draw:
  Irina Falconi

The following players received entry from the qualifying draw:
  Quinn Gleason
  Eri Hozumi

Retirements
  Yanina Wickmayer (lower back injury)

Women's doubles main-draw entrants

Seeds 

 1 Rankings as of 20 January 2020

Other entrants 
The following pair received a wildcard into the doubles main draw:
  Francesca Di Lorenzo /  Catherine Harrison

The following pair received entry as alternates:
  Marie Benoît /  Jessika Ponchet

Withdrawals 
Before the tournament
  Yanina Wickmayer (lower back injury)

Champions

Men's singles

 Thai-Son Kwiatkowski def.  Daniel Elahi Galán 6–4, 6–1.

Women's singles

  Madison Brengle def.  Stefanie Vögele, 6–1, 3–6, 6–2

Men's doubles

 Ariel Behar /  Gonzalo Escobar def.  Antonio Šančić /  Tristan-Samuel Weissborn 6–2, 6–4.

Women's doubles

  Hayley Carter /  Luisa Stefani def.  Marie Benoît /  Jessika Ponchet, 6–1, 6–3

References

External links 
 Official website

2020
2020 ATP Challenger Tour
2020 WTA 125K series
2020 in American tennis
2020 in sports in California
January 2020 sports events in the United States
February 2020 sports events in the United States